Anders Westenholz (October 21, 1936 – November 21, 2010) was a Danish psychologist and writer.

Overview
Anders Westenholz became a student in 1955, and a psychologist in 1969. From 1969-76 he was employed by Dansk Arbejdsgiverforening (English: The Confederation of Danish Employers). He's been included in the prestigious Danish book of biographies, Kraks Blå Bog (English: Krak's Blue Book). He's been granted financial support or backing from Statens Kunstfond (English: Danish Arts Agency) eight times throughout his career as a writer. In 1974 he received the RAI Prix Italia for his radio play Skriget fra Golgatha (English: The Scream from Golgatha). In 1981 he received Gyldendals Boglegat (English: Gyldendal's Book Grant) and in 1988 Johannes Ewalds Legat (English: Johannes Ewald's Grant).

His works
Anders Westenholz' works are generally divided into four groups: works of fiction, works on psychology, biographical works on Danish Sumatra rubber plantation manager Vilhelm Jung and works on his own famous great aunt Karen Blixen's life and works. He is credited as the ideas man behind two episodes of the popular Danish TV-series Huset på Christianshavn, namely #64, Karlas kald (English: Karla's Calling), scripted by Karen Smith and #68, Dagen efter dagen derpå (English: The Day after the Following Day), scripted by Henning Bahs.

As a writer of fiction he has written poetry, short stories, novels and plays (mostly for radio), and in genres he has dealt with both social realism and the fantastic. During his authorship he has experimented a lot with genres and language structures, which led famous Danish writer and critic Poul Borum (1934–1996) to write about him in a review: "Anders Westenholz is difficult to read, but worth every effort".

It's the fantastic genres that dominate Anders Westenholz' authorship, and he is one of the first Danish writers to seriously deal with fantasy, and he has also touched upon new age as a genre. And not just with youngsters, who he sometimes writes to, as a target group. Together with for instance Erwin Neutzsky-Wulff he is among the few Danish writers to write fantastic literature (fantasy, sci-fi, horror etc.) for mature readers.

Apart from his work as a writer of his own accord, Anders Westenholz has also worked as a translator. In this regard he will probably be best known for his translations of the American D&D-related fantasy series DragonLance Chronicles and DragonLance Legends by Margaret Weis & Tracy Hickman as well as a number of works by Stephen King among others.

Bibliography

Works of fiction
 Polyp (English: Polyp), novel, 1968
 Martyrium (English: Martyrdom), novel, 1970
 [Title unknown], short story in the anthology Og: en tekstantologi (English: And: A Text Anthology), 1971
 Det syvende æg (English: The Seventh Egg), novel, 1972
 Stueantennen (English: The Indoor Aerial), radio play, 1972
 Venskab, evt. ægteskab (English: Friendship, Possibly Marriage), radio play, 1972
 Skriget fra Golgatha (English: The Scream from Golgatha), radio play, 1973
 Glasmuren (English: The Glass Wall), novel, 1981
 Solen er kommet nærmere: digtcyklus (English: The Sun Has Come Closer: Cycle of Poems), poetry, 1983
 Den gamle fra havet (English: The Old One from the Sea), short story in the anthology At ønske en pludselig forvandling: ny dansk prosa (English: To Wish For A Sudden Change: New Danish Prose); ed. Uffe Andreasen og Erik Skyum-Nielsen, 1983
 Genkomsten (English: The Second Coming), novel, 1984
 Kommer straks (English: Won't Be A Minute), novel, 1984 - with Norman Lindtner
 Så I røgen? (English: Did You See the Smoke?), novel, 1985 - with Norman Lindtner
 Teknisk uheld (English: Technical Hitch), novel, 1986 - with Norman Lindtner
 Den Udvalgte (English: The Chosen), novel, 1986
 Den sorte influenza (English: The Black Flue), novel, Gyldendal, 1987
 Avinags kærlighed: radiospil i 2 dele (English: Avinag's Love: Radio Play in 2 Parts), radio play, 1987
 Søhestenes dal: roman i tre forspil og et coitus interruptus (English: Valley of the Seahorses: Novel in Three Foreplays and a Coitus Interruptus), novel, 1990
 Rubindragernes kyst (English: Shore of the Ruby Dragons), novel, 1993
 Dødesange (English: Death Songs), poetry, 1995
 Fluernes farve (English: Colour of the Flies), novel, 1996
 Fædrenes synder (English: Sins of the Fathers), novel, 2003
 Fanget i tiden (English: Caught in Time), novel, 2004 - sammen med Damián Arguimbau
 LæseLyst 13: Mona Lisa på afveje (English: Love of Reading 13: Mona Lisa Gone Astray) novel; part of an easily readable book series targeted for challenged readers, 2005

Works on psychology
 Hvad er meningen?: over- og undertoner i den daglige samtale (English: What's the Point?: Over- and Undertones in Daily Conversation), about interpersonal communication, 1990
 Tale er guld: mere om over- og undertoner i den daglige samtale (English: Speech is Golden: More about Over- and Undertones in Daily Conversation), about interpersonal communication, 1991
 Hvilken psykoterapi skal jeg vælge? (English: What Kind of Psychotherapy Should I Choose?), patient guide on psychotherapy, 2004

Works on Karen Blixen
 Den glemte abe: mand og kvinde hos Karen Blixen (English: The Forgotten Monkey: Mand and Woman in Karen Blixen), 1985
 The Power of Aries: myth and reality in Karen Blixen's life, Louisiana State University Press, 1987; translated from Danish: Kraftens horn: myte og virkelighed i Karen Blixens liv, published in 1982

Works on Vilhelm Jung
 Sådan gik det til (English: That's How It Happened), biography, 1988 - with Vilhelm Jung
 Det var det (English: That Was That), biography, 1989 - with Vilhelm Jung
 Så er det nok (English: That's Enough), biography, 1990 - with Vilhelm Jung

Other works
 Kolde Fødder (English: Cold Feet), play, never printed, 1974
 Det er absolut relativt: føre og uføre i moderne fysik (English: It's Absolutely Relative: Vice and Virtue in Modern Physics), science critique, 2001

See also

 Karen Blixen
 Dennis Jürgensen
 Svend Åge Madsen
 Erwin Neutzsky-Wulff

References

External links
 Anders Westenholz på OneTree Genealogy (www.sadolins.com)

1936 births
2010 deaths
Danish male poets
Danish male novelists
Danish children's writers
Danish fantasy writers
20th-century Danish translators
Danish psychologists
People from Copenhagen
20th-century Danish poets
20th-century Danish novelists
20th-century translators
20th-century Danish male writers